Cecil Aagaard (September 18, 1916 – December 19, 1984) was a Norwegian jazz vocalist and band leader dubbed "The biggest thing in swing" in Scandinavia's jazz milieu. He was active in Norway's swing movement (referred to as kløverjazz).

Filmography
1941: Ti gutter og en gjente as a firefighter

References

External links
 

1916 births
1984 deaths
Musicians from Larvik
Norwegian jazz singers